Kuna is the first Ukrainian and CIS cryptocurrency exchange. Amidst 2022 Russian invasion of Ukraine, Kuna became the biggest fundraising platform in Ukraine, having managed to accumulate over $100 million. The service was created in December 2015 by Mykhailo Chobanian. An open beta test of the service was launched on May 17, 2016.

In February 2022, Kuna.io partnered with the Ministry of Digital Transformation and created a special dedicated Crypto Fund for Ukraine which accumulated over $100 million donations during first 2 months of war with Russia. The Kuna crypto fundaraising phenomenon

was highlighted by TechCrunch, The Washington Post, Wired, Forbes, WSJ, Fortune, Atlantic Council and other media.

References

External links

Companies established in 2015
Digital currency exchanges